HSK may refer to:

 H. S. Krishnaswamy Iyengar
 Hanyu Shuiping Kaoshi or Chinese Proficiency Test
 Hassocks railway station, a railway station in Sussex, England
 Helsingfors Segelklubb, a Finnish sailing club
 Helsingfors Skridskoklubb, a Finnish figure skating club
 Homoserine kinase, an enzyme
 Horrendous Space Kablooie, a Calvin and Hobbes reference to the Big Bang
 Hung Shui Kiu station in Hong Kong (MTR station code)
 Hung Shui Kiu stop in Hong Kong (MTR Light Rail station code)
 Huesca–Pirineos Airport, in Spain
 Handels-Stör-Kreuzer, a German auxiliary cruiser
 Hohlschaftkegel ("hollow shank taper"), a form of machine taper